Lisle William "Liz" Blackbourn (June 3, 1899 – June 14, 1983) was an American football coach in Wisconsin, most notably as the third head coach of the Green Bay Packers, from 1954 through 1957, and the final head coach at Marquette University in Milwaukee in 1960.

Early years
Born in Beetown, Wisconsin, in 1899, Blackbourn attended high school in Lancaster and played college football at Lawrence College in Appleton, under head coach Mark Catlin, Sr. He arrived on campus in 1918, but left after a semester to work on the family farm for several years, then returned to school. He earned "all-state" honors three times for the Vikings and also was a catcher on the baseball team. While finishing his degree at Lawrence, he coached the Vikings' freshman football team in the fall of 1924.

Coaching career

High school coach
After earning his degree in 1925, he became head coach at Washington High School in Milwaukee and continued for 22 seasons, compiling a 141–30–6 record through 1946. While remaining as athletic director at the school, he was a scout for the University of Wisconsin–Madison under head coach Harry Stuhldreher.

College coach
In March 1948, Blackbourn resigned from the high school to become the backfield coach at Wisconsin, which was Stuhldreher's last with the Badgers, resigning in December. With a new staff at UW for 1949, Blackbourn moved over to Marquette University in Milwaukee as the line coach under head coach Frank Murray, who stepped down after the season for health reasons and was succeeded by Blackbourne in 1950. Blackbourne's 1953 team was 6–3–1, the best record at Marquette in over a decade.

Green Bay Packers
Succeeding Gene Ronzani as head coach of the Green Bay Packers, Blackbourn was hired in January 1954. He had a 17–31 record from 1954 through 1957, with no post-season appearances, as the only playoff then was the NFL title game. He was asked to resign at the end of the 1957 season after a disappointing 3–9 campaign, but refused and was fired in January 1958. While head coach, he drafted many future hall of famers, including Forrest Gregg, Bart Starr, Paul Hornung, Jim Taylor, Jerry Kramer and Ray Nitschke. He was still the Packers head coach during the first part of 1958 NFL Draft, with the first four rounds conducted in early December 1957. The Packers' first four picks are considered among the best by a team in league history. In addition to Taylor, Nitschke and Kramer, linebacker Dan Currie was selected.

Carroll College
After the dismissal by the Packers, Blackbourn became the head coach at Carroll College in Waukesha, Wisconsin for a single season in 1958, with a record of 6–2.

Return to Marquette
Blackbourn was the 16th head coach at Marquette and held that position twice for a total of six seasons, four from 1950 through 1953 and two from 1959 through 1960. His coaching record at Marquette was 24–30–4. He ranks third in total wins at Marquette and twelfth in winning percentage.

Later life and death
After its football program was discontinued in December 1960, he was a scout in professional football for the Packers and others until he retired in 1972. Blackbourn was inducted into the Wisconsin Athletic Hall of Fame in 1978, and died in 1983 in his hometown of Lancaster.

Head coaching record

College

NFL

References

External links
 Wisconsin Football Coaches Association profile
 

1899 births
1983 deaths
Carroll Pioneers football coaches
Green Bay Packers head coaches
Lawrence Vikings football coaches
Lawrence Vikings football players
Marquette Golden Avalanche football coaches
Wisconsin Badgers football coaches
High school football coaches in Wisconsin
People from Lancaster, Wisconsin
Coaches of American football from Wisconsin
Players of American football from Wisconsin